Manuel Sapunga Mbara (born 22 January 1992) is an Equatorial Guinean professional footballer who plays as a goalkeeper for South African National First Division club Polokwane City FC and the Equatorial Guinea national team.

Early life
Sapunga was raised in Cameroon. His father is Cameroonian and his mother is Equatoguinean Fang.

Club career
Sapunga has played for Leones Vegetarianos FC, Sony de Elá Nguema, Deportivo Mongomo and Futuro Kings in Equatorial Guinea.

International career
Sapunga capped for Equatorial Guinea at senior level during the 2021 Africa Cup of Nations.

Statistics

International

References

External links

1992 births
Living people
Equatoguinean footballers
Association football goalkeepers
Leones Vegetarianos FC players
CD Elá Nguema players
Deportivo Mongomo players
Futuro Kings FC players
Polokwane City F.C. players
Equatorial Guinea international footballers
2021 Africa Cup of Nations players
Equatoguinean expatriate footballers
Equatoguinean expatriate sportspeople in South Africa
Expatriate soccer players in South Africa
Equatoguinean people of Cameroonian descent
Sportspeople of Cameroonian descent
Citizens of Cameroon through descent
Cameroonian people of Equatoguinean descent